The 1972 Oklahoma Sooners football team represented the University of Oklahoma in the 1972 NCAA University Division football season. Oklahoma was a member of the Big Eight Conference and played its home games in Oklahoma Memorial Stadium, where it has played its home games since 1923.

The Sooners' 1972 record is marred by the use of an ineligible player.  In self-reporting the violations to the NCAA, Oklahoma voluntarily forfeited eight games. The NCAA later penalized the program by reducing scholarships, TV appearances and bowl appearances. In 2008 a blogger for Washington, DC TV station WJLA stated, "The NCAA claims that according to a now-retired statistician of the era, and a review of its database (which the NCAA admits might not be totally complete) that forfeits were NOT  part of the NCAA sanctions levied against the Sooners." A commenter stated, "The 1972 forfeits by Oklahoma were sanctioned by The Big Eight. As such Oklahoma's conference record was adjusted, while their overall record was not. In older Oklahoma media guide ... Oklahoma would show their record as 11-1 with a 3-4 conference record (reflecting 3 forfeits, despite the original 7 or 8 forfeited. ...) Also, if you check the media guides of the teams Oklahoma "forfeited" to, Missouri, Kansas and Oklahoma State, you'll not[e] similar adjustments. Each team didn't change their overall record, but changed their conference record."  Oklahoma had used players (including Kerry Jackson, the team's first black quarterback) with falsified transcripts and on April 18, 1973, voluntarily forfeited eight games. Eventually, the Big Eight sanctioned the forfeit of three conference victories (Missouri, Kansas, and Oklahoma State), but Oklahoma now recognizes these as wins and claims the 1972 conference title.

Oklahoma was led by four All-Americans: Rod Shoate (OU's second three-time All-American), Greg Pruitt, Tom Brahaney and Derland Moore.  This was the first season that the Selmon brothers Lucious, Lee Roy and Dewey, all eventual All-Americans, anchored the defensive line.   The Sooners played seven ranked opponents (In order, #10 Texas, #9 Colorado, #14 Iowa State, #14 Missouri, #5 Nebraska, #20 Oklahoma State, and #5 Penn State), and four of these opponents finished the season ranked.  Oklahoma's only loss on the field was in the fifth game against Colorado.  The team concluded its season with a  victory over Penn State in the Sugar Bowl on New Year's Eve.

Pruitt led the Sooners in rushing with 1024 yards, Dave Robertson led in passing with 1136 yards, and Tinker Owens led in receiving
(for the first of four consecutive seasons) with 430 yards. Pruitt led in scoring with 86 points, Shoate in tackles with 145, and Dan Ruster in interceptions with seven.

The 1972 Sooners twice posted 37 first downs, which was a school record that stood for 16 seasons.

Schedule

Roster

Game summaries

Utah State

Kerry Jackson 10 Rush, 109 Yds

Oregon

Greg Pruitt 11 Rush, 103 Yds, TD

Clemson

    
    
    
    
    
    
    
    
    

Tim Welch 24 Rush, 158 Yds

vs. Texas

at Colorado

Kansas State

at Iowa State

Missouri

at Kansas

at Nebraska

Oklahoma State

Joe Washington 21 Rush, 109 Yds, 2 TD
Leon Crosswhite 27 Rush, 106 Yds

Sugar Bowl (vs Penn State)

Attendance: 84,031 (Tulane Stadium)
OU Owens 27 yd pass from Robertson (Fulcher kick)
OU Crosswhite 1 yd run (Fulcher kick)
Passing: OU Robertson 3/6, 88 Yds, TD, PSU Hufnagel 12/31, 147 Yds, INT
Rushing: OU Pruitt 21/86, PSU Nagle 10/22
Receiving: OU Owens 5/132, TD, PSU Scott 3/59

Rankings

Awards and honors
All-American: Greg Pruitt, Rod Shoate, Tom Brahaney and Derland Moore

Postseason

NFL draft
The following players were drafted into the National Football League following the season.

References

External links
 Sports Reference – 1972 Oklahoma football season

Oklahoma
Oklahoma Sooners football seasons
Sugar Bowl champion seasons
Oklahoma Sooners football